Klondike is an American drama series about life in an Alaskan town in the 1890s during the Klondike Gold Rush. It stars Ralph Taeger and James Coburn and aired on NBC during the 1960–1961 television season.

Synopsis
Mike Halliday is a rugged outdoorsman who has come to Skagway in the Territory of Alaska in search of gold and adventure during the Klondike Gold Rush of 1896–1899. Halliday often comes into conflict with Jeff Durain, a fast-talking adventurer prone to making money by illegal means. Durain owns and operates a hotel in Skagway which offers the miners and prospectors who have come to town for the gold rush the opportunity to gamble, but the games usually are rigged for Durain's benefit.

Kathy O'Hara is the honest owner of another hotel in Skagway, and Halliday often works with her to block Durain from succeeding in his illegal schemes. Mike and Kathy have an affectionate relationship, but in his romantic life, Halliday plays the field, and is involved with a number of women, including Durain's girlfriend, the beautiful but greedy Goldie, who often is an accomplice in Durain's crimes.

Cast
 Ralph Taeger...Mike Halliday
 James Coburn...Jefferson "Jeff" Durain
 Mari Blanchard...Kathy O'Hara
 Joi Lansing...Goldie

Production

Ziv-United Artists Television produced Klondike on a low budget. William Conrad served as producer for the series. Vic Mizzy and Mann Curtis composed the show's theme music. The series was based on the book The Klondike Fever by Pierre Berton.

After Klondike was cancelled in mid-season, Ralph Taeger and James Coburn immediately moved together to a new series, Acapulco, in which they were cast as a pair of twentieth-century beachcombers in Acapulco, Mexico. Acapulco aired in Klondike′s time slot, beginning two weeks after the broadcast of Klondike′s last new episode.

Broadcast history

Eighteen episodes of Klondike were produced. They aired on NBC on Mondays at 9:00 p.m. Eastern Time from October 10, 1960, to February 13, 1961.

Episodes
SOURCE

References

External links
  
 Klondike opening credits on YouTube
 Klondike episode "The Hostages" on YouTube

1960s American drama television series
1960 American television series debuts
1961 American television series endings
Black-and-white American television shows
NBC original programming
Television shows set in Alaska
English-language television shows
1960s Western (genre) television series